Srpski košarkaški klub Borac 1947, commonly referred to as SKK Borac 1947, is a men's professional basketball club based in Banja Luka, Republika Srpska, Bosnia and Herzegovina. It is a part of the Borac Banja Luka Sports Society. They play in the 3rd-tier Second League of Republika Srpska, Western Division.

History

Sponsorship naming
The club has had several denominations through the years due to its sponsorship:
 Borac Incel (1985–1992)
 Borac Borovica (1992–1993)
 Borac Nektar (1994–2003)
 Banjalučka pivara (2003–2006)

Home arena
Borac 1947 played its home games at the Obilićevo Sports Hall. The hall is located in the Obilićevo Neighbourhood, Banja Luka, and was built in 1977. It has a seating capacity of 400 seats.

Between the 1970s and 2006, Borac and Banjalučka pivara played its home games at the Borik Sports Hall. The hall is located in the Borik Neighbourhood, Banja Luka, and was built in 1974. It has a seating capacity of 3,060 seats.

Players

Head coaches

Borac (1947–2003)
 Đorđe Mikeš (1986)
 Borislav Džaković (1989)
 Miodrag Baletić (1992–1993)
 Slobodan Simović (1994–1995)
 Velimir Gašić (1995–1996)
 Miodrag Baletić (1997–1998)
 Drago Karalić (1998–1999)
 Velimir Gašić (1999–2001)
 Drago Karalić (2002–2003)
Banjalučka pivara (2003–2006)
 Drago Karalić (2003)
 Nenad Trajković (2003–2004)
 Predrag Jaćimović (2004)
 Drago Karalić (2004–2006)
Borac 1947 (2018 onwards)
 Bojan Božić (2018–2021)

Season-by-season

1997–2006

2018–present

Trophies and awards

Trophies 
Championship of Bosnia and Herzegovina
Winners  (1): 1999–2000
Mirza Delibašić Cup
Winners  (1): 1999–2000
First League of Republika Srpska (2nd-tier)
Winners  (7): 1993–94, 1994–95, 1995–96, 1996–97, 1997–98, 1998–99, 2001–02 
Republika Srpska Cup (2nd-tier)
Winners  (7): 1993–94, 1994–95, 1995–96, 1996–97, 1997–98, 1998–99, 2001–02

Notable players

 Aleksandar Damjanović
 Marko Šćekić
 Dragan Aleksić
 Feliks Kojadinović
 Zlatko Jovanović
 Vladimir Zujović

References

External links

Basketball teams in Bosnia and Herzegovina
Basketball teams in Yugoslavia
Basketball teams established in 1947
Sport in Banja Luka